Øyvind Hoås (born 28 October 1983) is a Norwegian football striker who currently plays for Kristiansund.

He previously played for Fredrikstad, but left in 2008. He joined Fredrikstad from Molde FK in 2003. Ahead of the 2007–08 season, he was on a trial with English League One side Luton Town.

At , Hoås is one of the tallest outfield top-flight footballers in Europe.

He is a former under-21 international with Norway, scoring one goal in four appearances.

He scored the last league goal to be scored in Fredrikstad's old ground and the first goal in their new stadium as well.

Career statistics

References

External links
 
Øyvind Hoås at Sarpsborg08.no
Guardian's Stats Centre 

1983 births
Living people
People from Molde
Sportspeople from Møre og Romsdal
Norwegian footballers
Association football forwards
Molde FK players
Fredrikstad FK players
Sarpsborg 08 FF players
Hønefoss BK players
Kristiansund BK players
Eliteserien players
Norwegian First Division players